Reftinsky is an urban locality (a work settlement) under the administrative jurisdiction of the Town of Asbest in Sverdlovsk Oblast, Russia. Population:

Administrative and municipal status
Within the framework of the administrative divisions, the work settlements of Reftinsky and Malysheva, together with five rural localities, are subordinated to the Town of Asbest—an administrative unit with the status equal to that of the districts. As a municipal division, the work settlement of Reftinsky is incorporated separately as Reftinsky Urban Okrug. The work settlement of Malysheva, together with three rural localities under the administrative jurisdiction of the Town of Asbest, is incorporated separately as Malyshevsky Urban Okrug, and the town of Asbest, together with two other rural localities, is incorporated separately as Asbestovsky Urban Okrug.

References

Notes

Sources

Urban-type settlements in Sverdlovsk Oblast
